Kwame Adzenyina Yeboah (born 2 June 1994) is an Australian former professional footballer who played as a forward.

Yeboah played youth football with the Queensland Academy of Sport and Gold Coast United before making his professional debut for Brisbane Roar in 2013. In 2014, he moved to Germany to play for Borussia Mönchengladbach II. Following a loan at SC Paderborn and a move to Fortuna Köln, he returned to Australia joining Western Sydney Wanderers. He retired from football in October 2021, becoming a professional model.

Yeboah represented Australia at under-17 and under-23 levels.

Early life 
Yeboah was born in Yirrkala in Northern Territory, Australia to a Ghanaian father and Australian mother. He attended Varsity College on the Gold Coast and began playing junior football at the age of seven. He learned Capoeira in his younger years and often celebrated a goal in football with a back flip. He was offered a scholarship with the Queensland Academy of Sport in 2009 and spent several years with the team before Gold Coast United showed interest.

Club career

Gold Coast United 
Yeboah was signed by Gold Coast United in 2011. He spent the 2011–12 season playing with the Gold Coast's National Youth League team. The club folded in 2012 and Yeboah signed with Brisbane Roar.

Brisbane Roar 
Yeboah made his first team debut for Brisbane in a semi final loss to Western Sydney Wanderers, coming on as an 83rd-minute substitute for winger Ben Halloran.

On 4 March 2013, it was announced that Yeboah had signed a Senior NYL contract to step up to the first team squad. Yeboah made his starting debut in Brisbane's 2–1 win away to Wellington Phoenix in the opening round of the 2013–14 A-League season. Six days later, Yeboah made his home debut in Brisbane's convincing 4–0 win against Sydney FC. He started the first four games of the 2013–14 season before Mike Mulvey relegated the young striker to the bench for the fifth-round game against 2012–13 champions Central Coast Mariners due to indifferent form. Yeboah came off the bench in the 87th minute to score his first goal for Brisbane in the 89th minute with a 1–0 win.  He followed it up by scoring a goal the next week against Western Sydney Wanderers, celebrated with his back flip goal celebration.

Borussia Mönchengladbach 
On 20 December 2013, Yeboah signed a four-year contract with Bundesliga side Borussia Mönchengladbach and officially moved in the January 2014 transfer window. He initially joined the reserve side.  In his absence, Brisbane Roar went on to win the 2014 A-League Grand Final.

In May 2017, Yeboah extended his contract with Borussia Mönchengladbach for two more years.

In January 2018, Yeboah was loaned to SC Paderborn 07 until the end of the season.

Fortuna Köln 
In July 2018, Yeboah joined 3. Liga club Fortuna Köln on a two-year contract.

Retirement 
Yeboah retired from football in October 2021, signing a deal to become a professional model.

International career 
Yeboah is eligible to represent both Australia and Ghana in international competition. He has been called up several times for the Australian youth teams but has no senior debut for any country.

Career statistics

Club

Honours
Borussia Mönchengladbach II
 Regionalliga West: 2014–15

References

External links 
 

1994 births
Living people
Sportspeople from the Gold Coast, Queensland
Sportspeople from Queensland
Australian soccer players
Association football forwards
Australia youth international soccer players
Australian people of Ghanaian descent
Brisbane Roar FC players
Borussia Mönchengladbach II players
SC Paderborn 07 players
SC Fortuna Köln players
Western Sydney Wanderers FC players
A-League Men players
3. Liga players
Regionalliga players
Australian expatriate soccer players
Expatriate footballers in Germany
Australian expatriate sportspeople in Germany